Hialeah shooting may refer to:

2013 Hialeah shooting, in which seven people died in an apartment complex
2021 Hialeah shooting, in which three people died in a club shooting